Arthur Logan may refer to:

 Arthur J. Logan, United States Army general
 Arthur C. Logan (died 1973), American surgeon